The 1934–35 Sussex County Football League season was the 15th in the history of the competition.

League table
The league featured 13 clubs which competed in the last season, no new clubs joined the league this season.

League table

References

1934-35
9